Galina Yakusheva (born 14 July 1988) is a Kazakhstani race walker. She represented Kazakhstan at the 2022 World Athletics Championships, competing in 20 kilometres walk and 35 kilometres walk.

References

External links
 

1988 births
Living people
Kazakhstani female racewalkers
Place of birth missing (living people)
World Athletics Championships athletes for Kazakhstan
20th-century Kazakhstani women
21st-century Kazakhstani women